NGC 1901 is an open cluster in the Dorado Constellation. It has a bright middle and is a little rich, with stars from 7th magnitude downwards. The celestial object was discovered on 30 December 1836 by the British astronomer John Herschel. The cluster is sparsely populated with GAIA data suggesting a membership of around 80 stars. It is considered unlikely it will survive its next pass through the Milky Way’s galactic plane in about 18 million years time.

References

Open clusters
Dorado (constellation)
ESO objects
1901
Astronomical objects discovered in 1836